As of 2020, there are 112 Military Hospitals, 12 Air Force Hospitals and 10 Naval Hospitals in India.

Indian Air Force

Indian Army

Indian Navy

See also
Command Hospital
Army Medical Corps (India)
List of Indian Navy bases
List of Indian Air Force stations

References

Hospitals
Hospitals
Hospitals
Armed Forces
 
Hospitals